Shuki Levy (born June 3, 1947) is an Israeli-American music composer and television producer. Levy's best known work is soundtrack compositions for children's television programs of the 1980s, such as The Real Ghostbusters, Inspector Gadget, The Mysterious Cities of Gold, M.A.S.K., Dinosaucers, He-Man and the Masters of the Universe, She-Ra: Princess of Power, and Jayce and the Wheeled Warriors. In the 1990s, he became known chiefly for his work on the Power Rangers franchise, Digimon: Digital Monsters, Masked Rider, VR Troopers, and Big Bad Beetleborgs. He has also written and directed numerous episodes for some these television shows, and directed a few films, such as Perfect Victims (1988) and Blind Vision (1991). He was also part of a musical duo known as Shuky & Aviva (alternatively Shuki & Aviva) with his partner Aviva Paz.

Life and career

Beginnings
Levy was born in British Mandate of Palestine (now Israel) in 1947. His father was an Ashkenazi Jew originally from Russia, and his mother of Sephardic Jewish origin.

His career began as a singer and music performer, playing in various clubs around Tel Aviv. He also appeared in the musical "Hair."

Shuky & Aviva
During the 1970s, Levy performed in France and Germany as a duo known as "Shuki & Aviva" or "Shuky and Aviva" as written on a lot of the duos song releases. Together with his partner Aviva Paz he scored a hit single throughout Europe called "Signorina - Concertina" which sold two million copies. Levy composed "Halayla", the Israeli entry to the 1981 Eurovision Song Contest.

Saban Entertainment
While living in Paris, he met businessman and musician Haim Saban, with the two becoming close friends and frequent collaborators. In an interview, Levy recalled "Haim said, 'We'll be co-composer. You do the composing, I'll do the deals.' I figured, 'Great. Brothers.' That was the last business conversation we had for many years. We were partners. We never had a written agreement. It was all verbal." They eventually moved to Los Angeles and founded Saban Entertainment, a production company responsible for numerous animated shows and Japanese adaptions, such as Digimon, X-Men, Spider-Man and Power Rangers. The company was sold to The Walt Disney Company by the end of 2001.

During the 1980s and 1990s, he was noted for composing a large volume of television music; according to BMI's music publishing database, he has written a combined total of 3,928 themes, background scores and songs. In a 1998 investigation by The Hollywood Reporter, it was revealed that many of these compositions were ghostwritten by other composers, in order for Levy and Haim Saban to gain control of all publishing rights and music royalty revenue.

On October 3, 2013, Shuki Levy started working on a TV show he created called Tribe Of The Wild which was originally set for a 2014 release, but got delayed to 2015 instead. Levy also signed a first-look production deal with Relativity Media to oversee worldwide distribution, finance and production for Levy's content in the children's and family space, Tribe Of The Wild was the first show under the deal.

Personal life
In 1977, Levy was married to Miss USA 1970 and actress Deborah Shelton (Dallas), with whom he has a daughter, Tamara (born 1981). He was also in a relationship with television actress Sarah Brown (General Hospital), with whom he has a second daughter, Jordan (born 1998).

Musical compositions
Shuki Levy is credited as a composer on the following works:

Musicals
2007. Imagine This

TV series
2015. Tribe Of The Wild
2001.  Digimon Tamers
2001. Power Rangers Time Force
2001.  Mon Colle Knights
2000. Shinzo
2000. NASCAR Racers
2000.  Digimon Adventure 02
2000.  The Vision of Escaflowne
2000. Power Rangers Lightspeed Rescue
2000.  Action Man
1999. The Avengers: United They Stand
1999. Digimon Adventure
1999. Power Rangers Lost Galaxy
1999. Spider-Man Unlimited
1998. The Secret Files of the Spy Dogs
1998. Power Rangers In Space
1998. The Silver Surfer
1997. The Adventures of Huckleberry Finn
1997. The Adventures of Tom Sawyer
1997. Power Rangers Turbo
1997. Saban's Adventures of Oliver Twist
1997. Breaker High
1997. Ninja Turtles: The Next Mutation
1996. Big Bad Beetleborgs
1996. Little Mouse on the Prairie
1996. The Incredible Hulk
1996. Bureau of Alien Detectors
1996. The Mouse and the Monster
1996. Power Rangers Zeo
1996. Eagle Riders (Dubbed version of Gatchaman II and Gatchaman Fighter)
1996. Dragon Ball Z
1995. Tenko and the Guardians of the Magic
1995. Space Strikers
1995. Super Pig
1995. Iznogoud
1995. Masked Rider
1995. Space Strikers
1994. VR Troopers
1994. Spider-Man
1994. Sweet Valley High
1994. Creepy Crawlers
1994. Teknoman (Dubbed version of Tekkaman Blade)
1994. Honeybee Hutch
1994. BattleTech
1993. Walter Melon
1993. Mad Scientist Toon Club
1993. Mighty Morphin Power Rangers
1993. Journey to the Heart of the World
1992. The Adventures of Pinocchio
1992. Jin Jin and the Panda Patrol
1992. King Arthur & the Knights of Justice
1992. X-Men
1991. Rock 'n Cop (German and Swedish dubbed versions of Future Police Urashiman — no English version was released)
1991. Samurai Pizza Cats
1991. Little Shop
1991. Maya the Bee
1991. Space Cats
1990. Attack of the Killer Tomatoes
1990. Lucky Luke
1990. Adventures of the Little Mermaid
1989. The New Adventures of He-Man
1989. The Legend of Zelda
1989. Grimm's Fairy Tale Classics
1989. The Super Mario Bros. Super Show!
1989. Camp Candy
1989. The Karate Kid
1989. Ring Raiders
1989. Captain N: The Game Master
1989. Dragon Warrior
1988. ALF Tales
1988. Noozles
1988. COPS
1988. RoboCop: The Animated Series 
1988. Hey Vern, It's Ernest!
1987. Hello Kitty's Furry Tale Theater
1987. ALF: The Animated Series
1987. Beverly Hills Teens
1987. Sylvanian Families
1987. Maxie's World
1987. The New Archies
1987. Dinosaucers
1987. Maple Town
1987. Diplodo
1987. Lady Lovelylocks And The Pixietails
1987. Starcom: The U.S. Space Force
1986. Dennis The Menace
1986. Zoobilee Zoo
1986. The Real Ghostbusters
1986. Rambo and the Forces of Freedom
1986. Popples
1985. M.A.S.K.
1985. She-Ra: Princess of Power
1985. Rainbow Brite
1985. Jayce and the Wheeled Warriors
1985. It's Punky Brewster
1985. Kissyfur
1984. Punky Brewster
1984. Going Bananas
1984. Pole Position
1984. Kidd Video
1984. Heathcliff & The Catillac Cats
1984. The Get Along Gang
1984. Photon
1983. Mister T
1983. Inspector Gadget
1983. The Littles
1983. He-Man and the Masters of the Universe
1983. Saturday Supercade
1982. Urusei Yatsura (aka Lamù, La Ragazza Dello Spazio) (Italian dub only) 
1982. Bomber X (additional music, French dub only)
1982. The Mysterious Cities of Gold
1981. Spider Woman (French and Italian dub only)
1981. Ulysses 31
1980. Heathcliff
1975. Steel Jeeg
1975. Time Bokan

TV
2000. Final Ascent
1997. Dragon Ball Z: The Tree of Might
1994. Blindfold: Acts of Obsession
1994. Honor Thy Father and Mother: The True Story of the Menendez Murders
1994. Guns Of Honor
1993. Under Investigation
1992. Revenge on the Highway
1987. Bay Coven
1985. He-Man and She-Ra: A Christmas Special

Videos
2003. Itty Bitty Heartbeats
1996. Spider-Man: Sins of the Fathers
1991. Sugar & Spice: The Wizard of Oz
1991. Sugar & Spice: Alice in Wonderland
1991. Sugar & Spice: Cinderella
1991. Sugar & Spice: Heidi
1991. Sugar & Spice: Snow White
1989. Little Golden Book Land
1986. My Favorite Fairy Tales
1985. Punky Brewster: More For Your Punky
1980. Goldwing

Films
2000. Digimon: The Movie
1998. Rusty: The Great Rescue
1996. Susie Q
1995. Mighty Morphin Power Rangers: The Movie
1992. Round Trip to Heaven
1992. Blind Vision
1992. Prey Of The Chameleon
1989. Trapper Country War
1988. Perfect Victims
1987. Barbie and the Rockers: Out of This World
1987. Barbie and the Sensations: Rockin' Back to Earth
1986. Heathcliff: The Movie
1985. Rainbow Brite and the Star Stealer
1985. He-Man And She-Ra: The Secret of the Sword
1985. Here Come the Littles
1984. Fatal Games
1984. The Secret of the Selenites
1983. Les Dalton En Cavale
1982. Blood Tide
1981. Dawn of the Mummy

Screenwriting credits

Television
 Wolf Rock TV (1984)
 Kidd Video (1985)
 Mighty Morphin Power Rangers (1993-1996)
 Masked Rider (1995)
 Big Bad Beetleborgs (1996)
 Power Rangers Zeo (1996)
 Power Rangers Turbo (1997)

Film
 Perfect Victims (1988)
 Blind Vision (1992)
 Round Trip to Heaven (1992)
 Someone to Die For (1995)
 Susie Q (1996)
 Turbo: A Power Rangers Movie (1997)
 Exception to the Rule (1997)
 Rusty: A Dog's Tale (1998)
 Aussie and Ted's Great Adventure (2009)

Director

Television
 Mighty Morphin Power Rangers (1993-1995)
 VR Troopers (1994)
 Masked Rider (1995)
 Big Bad Beetleborgs (1996)
 Power Rangers Turbo (1997)

Film
 Perfect Victims (1988)
 Blind Vision (1992)
 Turbo: A Power Rangers Movie (1997)
 Rusty: A Dog's Tale (1998)
 Aussie and Ted's Great Adventure (2009)

Discography
(As part of duo Shuky & Aviva)

Albums
Love Is Like (1974)
Shuky & Aviva (1976)
Shuky & Aviva Album N°2 (1977)

Compilation albums
The Very Best Of Shuki & Aviva (1974)
The Hits Collection (1990)
Best of Shuky & Aviva (2002) 
Shuky & Aviva (4xCD) (2013)

Singles
"L' amour c' est la musique de la vie" (1972)
"Viens que je t'embrasse" / "La separation" (1972)
"Signorina Concertina" / "I'll Never Let You Go" (1972)
"Here Comes Summertime" (1972)
"When I'm Dreaming" (1973)
"Sixteen Brothers" / "On My Own" (1973) 
"Listen to the Children" / "Ecoutez les enfants" (1973)
"Ca ne suffit pas" / "C'est trop tard" (1973)
"Did I ever say goodbye" / "Roller Coaster" (1974)
"Did I Hear You Say Good-Bye" (1974) 
"Bye, Bye, a bientôt" / Des dimanches d'amour" (1975)	
"Bye Bye Ciao My Love" (1975)
"Je t'aime un peu trop" (1975)
"Prends ma chemise" (1976)
"Fête d'amour" / Ils ne mont parlé que de toi" (1976)
"Comme Si" (The Air That I Breath) (1976)
"Hotel California" / "S'aimer comme on s'aime" (1977)
"Mais bien sur je t'aime" / "J'aime quelqu'un d'hereux" (1977)
"Je ne fait que passer" / "C'est beaucoup mieux comme ça" (1977) 
"Fallait fallait pas" (1978)

in German
"Lern' Mit Den Augen Der Kinder Zu Sehen" (1973)
"Ein Platz Für Die Liebe" (1974)
"Wir Glauben An Das Leben" (1974)
"Du Und Ich Und Zwei Träume" (1975)
"Zum Glück Gibt Es Musik" (1975)
"Ich Liebe Dich Ja Viel Zu Sehr" (1976)

References

External links
 Shuki Levy Online
 Levy discusses his work on The Real Ghostbusters
 
 Discogs: Shuky & Aviva

1947 births
20th-century American composers
21st-century American composers
American film producers
American film score composers
American male film score composers
American male television writers
American people of Russian-Jewish descent
American Sephardic Jews
American television composers
American television producers
American television writers
Animated film score composers
Animation composers
Anime composers
Israeli emigrants to the United States
Israeli film score composers
Israeli Ashkenazi Jews
Israeli Sephardi Jews
Israeli people of Russian-Jewish descent
Israeli television producers
Jewish American film score composers
Jewish American television composers
Living people
Male television composers
Saban Entertainment